The Kikambala nothobranch (Nothobranchius interruptus) is a species of killifish in the family Nothobranchiidae. It is endemic to Kenya.  Its natural habitats are swamps and temporary pools.

Sources 

Kikambala nothobranch
Endemic freshwater fish of Kenya
Taxa named by Rudolf Hans Wildekamp
Taxa named by Heinz Otto Berkenkamp
Fish described in 1979
Taxonomy articles created by Polbot